Al-Mahanawiya Sport Club is an Iraqi football team based in Al-Qādisiyyah, that plays in Iraq Division Three.

Managerial history
 Hassan Faleh

See also 
 2002–03 Iraq FA Cup

References

External links
 Al-Mahanawiya SC on Goalzz.com
 Iraq Clubs- Foundation Dates

1999 establishments in Iraq
Association football clubs established in 1999
Football clubs in Al-Qādisiyyah